Paal (Limburgish: Poël) is a town and borough in the municipality of Beringen, in the Belgian Limburg Campine. Once known as Pael, the town has a long history.

The town plays an important role in both the industry and tourism of Beringen. The town has a recreational area, the "Paalse Plas", with ponds, a sailing lake and a golf course.

The annual Paal op Stelten music festival attracts 20,000 visitors to the town each August.

The industrial area along the A13 motorway houses the facilities of a number of multinational companies.

The studio of Radio Benelux, the local radio station for Beringen and surroundings, is located in Paal.

Population timeline 

Sources: NIS and www.limburg.be, City Beringen. Note: 1806 to 2001 = census; 1976 = population at 31 December 2006 = population at 1 January

Gallery

References

External links 
 Official site 

Populated places in Limburg (Belgium)